Wu Yet-An or Ng Yuet On or Ng Yet Ang or Ng Ynet-On (born 26 July 1927) was a basketball player who competed as part of the Republic of China's squad at the 1954 FIBA World Championship, 1954 Asian Games, and 1956 Summer Olympics and as part of the Hong Kong squad at the 1958 Asian Games. 

His younger brother Sima Ling was a novelist.

References

External links
 

1927 births
Possibly living people
Taiwanese people from Jilin
Chinese men's basketball players
Hong Kong men's basketball players
Basketball players from Changchun
Taiwanese men's basketball players
Olympic basketball players of Taiwan
Basketball players at the 1956 Summer Olympics
Basketball players at the 1954 Asian Games
Basketball players at the 1958 Asian Games
Asian Games medalists in basketball
Medalists at the 1954 Asian Games
Asian Games silver medalists for Chinese Taipei
1954 FIBA World Championship players
Republic of China men's national basketball team players